Holandriana is a genus of gastropods belonging to the monotypic family Amphimelaniidae.

The species of this genus are found in Europe, Northern America, Northern Africa.

Species:

Holandriana fossariformis 
Holandriana frici 
Holandriana fuchsi 
Holandriana gaji 
Holandriana heckneri 
Holandriana hellespontica 
Holandriana holandrii 
Holandriana krambergeri 
Holandriana macedonica 
Holandriana patula 
Holandriana pecchiolii 
Holandriana ricinus 
Holandriana serbica

References

Gastropods